Jarqavieh County is in Isfahan province, Iran. The capital of the county is the city of Nikabad. At the 2006 census, the region's population (as Jarqavieh Olya District and Jarqavieh Sofla District of Isfahan County) was 35,069 in 9,526 households. The following census in 2011 counted 35,842 people in 10,852 households. At the 2016 census, the districts' population was 37,607 in 12,034 households. The districts were separated from Isfahan County in 2021 to form Jarqavieh County.

Administrative divisions

The population history of Jarqavieh County's administrative divisions (as Jarqavieh Olya District and Jarqavieh Sofla District of Isfahan County) over three consecutive censuses is shown in the following table.

References

Counties of Isfahan Province

fa:شهرستان جرقویه